The 2022 Sparks 300 was the 28th stock car race of the 2022 NASCAR Xfinity Series, the second race of the Round of 12, and the 3rd iteration of the event. The race was held on Saturday, October 1, 2022, in Lincoln, Alabama at Talladega Superspeedway, a  permanent tri-oval shaped superspeedway. The race took the scheduled 113 laps to complete. In a close finish, A. J. Allmendinger, driving for Kaulig Racing, would hold off Sam Mayer on the final lap to earn his 14th career NASCAR Xfinity Series win, along with his fourth of the season. Allmendinger would beat Mayer by 0.015 of a second. He would also earn a spot in the next round of the playoffs. Austin Hill dominated the majority of the race, leading 60 laps and winning both stages. To fill out the podium, Landon Cassill, driving for Kaulig Racing, would finish in 3rd, respectively.

Background 
Talladega Superspeedway is located on the former Anniston Air Force Base in the small city of Lincoln. A tri-oval, the track was constructed in 1969 by the International Speedway Corporation, a business controlled by the France Family. , the track hosts the NASCAR Cup Series, NASCAR Xfinity Series, NASCAR Camping World Truck Series, and ARCA Menards Series. The total peak capacity of Talladega is around 175,000 spectators, with the main grandstand capacity being about 80,000.

Entry list 

 (R) denotes rookie driver.
 (i) denotes driver who are ineligible for series driver points.

Qualifying 
Qualifying was held on Friday, September 30, at 4:30 PM CST. Since Talladega Superspeedway is a superspeedway, the qualifying system used is a single-car, one-lap system with two rounds. In the first round, drivers have one lap to set a time. The fastest ten drivers from the first round move on to the second round. Whoever sets the fastest time in Round 2 wins the pole.

Race results 
Stage 1 Laps: 25

Stage 2 Laps: 25

Stage 3 Laps: 63

Standings after the race 

Drivers' Championship standings

Note: Only the first 12 positions are included for the driver standings.

References 

2022 NASCAR Xfinity Series
NASCAR races at Talladega Superspeedway
Sparks 300
2022 in sports in Alabama